Near-Infrared (NIR) Signature Management Technology is used to prevent detection of soldiers by NIR Image Converters. 
These photocathode devices do not detect temperatures, but rather infrared radiation variances. NIR-compliant uniforms use a special fabric that allows soldiers to appear at the same radiation level as the surrounding terrain, thus making them more difficult to detect.

United States Department of Defense